Villers-Tournelle is a commune in the Somme department in Hauts-de-France in northern France.

Geography
The commune is situated 27 km (16 miles) southeast of Amiens, on the D188 road

Population

See also
Communes of the Somme department

References

Communes of Somme (department)